This is a list of biodiversity databases. Biodiversity databases store taxonomic information alone or more commonly also other information like distribution (spatial) data and ecological data, which provide information on the biodiversity of a particular area or group of living organisms. They may store specimen-level information, species-level information, information on nomenclature, or any combination of the above. Most are available online.

Specimen-focused databases contain data about individual specimens, as represented by vouchered museum specimens, collections of specimen photographs, data on field-based specimen observations and morphological or genetic data. Species-focused databases contain information summarised at the species-level. Some species-focused databases attempt to compile comprehensive data about particular species (FishBase), while others focus on particular species attributes, such as checklists of species in a given area (FEOW) or the conservation status of species (CITES or IUCN Red List). Nomenclators act as summaries of taxonomic revisions and set  a key between specimen-focused and species-focused databases. They do this because taxonomic revisions use specimen data to determine species limits.

See also 
 Taxonomic database
 Biodiversity informatics
 Global biodiversity

References

External links
 List of species databases at the Catalogue of Life 
 List of biodiversity databases at Biodiversity Tools 

Databases
Biological databases
Biology-related lists
Biodiversity
Lists of websites